The Libera Awards, sometimes referred to as The Libbys, are an annual awards ceremony organized by the American Association of Independent Music (A2IM). First hosted in 2012, the awards celebrate the independent music community. The capstone of A2IM's Indie Week, an annual music business conference, the ceremony has been able to be viewed by the public since 2020.

The top-billed awards are generally Record of the Year and Best Live Act, in addition to Label of the Year, Best Sync Usage, and Video of the Year, among others. In addition to the awards which are voted on, A2IM annually confers the Lifetime Achievement and Independent Icon Awards to industry leaders and artists, respectively.

List of ceremonies

Award categories 
Note: the names of most categories have been tweaked overtime with the most significant name changes indicated below. Updated 2022.

Artist-specific awards 

 Best Live Act (2013–2014, 2016–)
 A2IM Humanitarian Award (2021–)
 Best Breakthrough Artist (2012–) (2012–2014: Up & Comer Award)

Former categories

 Road Warrior of the Year (2012–2016) (2013–2015: Hardest Working Artist; 2016: Into the Pit Award)

Record-specific awards 

 Record of the Year (2012–)
 Self-Released Record of the Year (2022–)
 A2IM Artist Record of the Year Award (2021–) (honors self-released artists)
 Best Alternative Rock Record (2020–) 
 Best Americana Record (2018–)
 Best Blues Record (2018–)
 Best Classical Record (2018–)
 Best Country Record (2018–)
 Best Dance Record (2022–)
 Best Electronic Record (2022–)
 Best Folk/Bluegrass Record (2020–)
 Best Heavy Record (2018, 2020–2021: Best Metal Record)
 Best Hip-Hop/Rap Record (2017–)
 Best Jazz Record (2018–)
 Best Latin Record (2018–)
 Best Outlier Record (2018–)
 Best Pop Record (2022–)
 Best Punk Record (2020–) (2020: Best Punk/Emo Album)
 Best R&B Record (2018–)
 Best Re-Issue (2018–)
 Best Rock Record (2018–) (2020: Best Mainstream Rock Album)
 Best Spiritual Record (2021–)
 Best World Record (2018–)

Former categories

 Groundbreaking Album of the Year (2015–2016)
 Heritage Album of the Year (2015–2016)
 Shifting Beats Award (2016)
 Best Blues/Jazz/R&B Album (2017)
 Best Classical/World Album (2017)
 Best Country/Americana/Folk Album (2017)
 Best Dance/Electronic Record (2017–2021)
 Best Metal/Hard Rock Album (2017)
 Best Indie Rock Album (2017)

Industry awards 

 Best Sync Usage (2012–)
 Video of the Year (2012–)
 Marketing Genius (2012–) (2012–2014: Light Bulb Award)
 Creative Packaging (2012–)
 Independent Champion (2012–) (2012–2013: 21st Century Award; 2014: Independent Ally of the Year; 2015: Marketplace Ally)
 Label of the Year (Small) (2012–)
 Label of the Year (Medium) (2019–) (2012–2018: combined into Indie Label (6 employees or more))
 Label of the Year (Big) (2019–) (2012–2018: combined into Indie Label (6 employees or more))

Former categories

 Music Supervisor (2012–2014)
 A&R Team of the Year (2016)
 Video of the Year (Fan Vote) (2017)

Special awards

A2IM Lifetime Achievement Award 
This award was first presented at the inaugural Libera Awards to honor contributions by industry leaders in independent music.

 2012: Martin Mills, founder of Beggars Group
 2013: Tom Silverman, founder of Tommy Boy Records
 2014: Bruce Iglauer, founder of Alligator Records
 2015: Patricia Chin and the Chin family, founder/founding family of VP Records
 2016: Mike Curb, founder of Curb Records
 2017: Ani DiFranco, artist and founder of Righteous Babe Records
 2018: Brett Gurewitz, founder of Epitaph Records and co-founder of Anti-
 2019: Jonathan Poneman, co-founder of Sub Pop
 2020: Seymour Stein, co-founder of Sire Records
 2021: TBD

Independent Icon Award 
This award was first presented at the 2016 Libera Awards to honor a "groundbreaking Independent artists who have contributed to the Independent community and have paved the way for future Independents to succeed on their own terms."  In 2015, it was presented as the Appleseed Award.

 2015: Alison Wenham (Worldwide Independent Network)
2016: Naughty By Nature
 2017: Nick Lowe
 2018: Funky 4 + 1
 2019: NPR (combined with Independent Champion Award)
 2020: John Prine, Alejandro Escovedo & Suzanne Ciani
 2021: Mavis Staples

Independent Impact Award 
Formally titled the A2IM Independent Impact Award (as of 2021) this award honors the independent artist with the highest combined sales and streams as measured by Nielsen Music across all of the artist's commercial releases in the U.S. between a yearlong period.

 2017: Florida Georgia Line – Dig Your Roots (Big Machine Label Group)
 2018: Taylor Swift – Reputation (Big Machine Label Group)
 2019: Was not awarded
 2020: Was not awarded
 2021: TBD

External links 

 The Libera Awards
 A2IM Indie Week

References 

American music awards
Performing arts trophies
Awards established in 2012
Libera Awards